Westside School District is a public school district serving western Johnson County, Arkansas, United States. The school district serves the rural communities of Hartman, Coal Hill and surrounding unincorporated areas.

The school district, headquartered in the Coal Hill Campus, located an unincorporated area next to Coal Hill, consists of two separate facilities for elementary and secondary education. The district is often referred to as Westside – Johnson County to distinguish itself from West Side – Cleburne County and Westside Consolidated – Craighead County school districts.

The Coal Hill and Hartman school districts merged into Westside effective July 1, 1983.

Schools 
The district and each of its two schools mascot and athletic emblem is the Rebel.
 Westside High School – provides secondary education for grades 7 through 12; based in the Coal Hill campus in an unincorporated area.
 Westside Elementary School – provides early childhood and elementary education for prekindergarten through grade 6; based in Hartman.

References

External links 

  
 

School districts in Arkansas
Education in Johnson County, Arkansas
1983 establishments in Arkansas
School districts established in 1983